Alma G. Stallworth (November 15, 1932 – August 25, 2020) was an American politician who served in the Michigan House of Representatives from 1971 to 1974, 1983 to 1996 and from 2003 to 2004. She also founded the Black Caucus Foundation of Michigan in 1985.

Born in Little Rock, Arkansas, she attended Wayne State University and Chelsea University. Stallworth is also an honorary member of Alpha Kappa Alpha sorority. She also served as a member of the Detroit Board of Education.

Stallworth died on August 25, 2020, in Detroit, Michigan, at age 87.

References

External links
 Alma Stallworth at votesmart.org

1932 births
2020 deaths
African-American women in politics
African-American state legislators in Michigan
Politicians from Little Rock, Arkansas
Politicians from Detroit
Wayne State University alumni
Women state legislators in Michigan
20th-century American women politicians
20th-century American politicians
Members of the Michigan House of Representatives
Members of the Detroit Board of Education
20th-century African-American women
20th-century African-American politicians
21st-century African-American people
21st-century African-American women